Tomma is an island in the municipality of Nesna in Nordland county, Norway.  The  island sits to the west of the islands of Handnesøya and Hugla.  The island is at the southern entrance to the Sjona fjord.  The main settlement on this island is the village of Husby, where the old Husby Estate and the Husby Chapel are located.

Name
The Old Norse form of the name was Þǫmb. This name is probably identical with the word þǫmb which means "paunch" or "belly". (It is common in Norway to compare topographic elements with parts of the human body.)

See also
List of islands of Norway

References

Nesna
Islands of Nordland